The Progressive Youth Organization was the youth organization of the Communist Party of Turkey (TKP). It was founded on 5 January 1976.

History
The İGD developed close relations with trade unions and other progressive organizations, took part in May Day celebrations, protests against DGMs (State Security Courts) and campaigns against the far-right Nationalist Movement Party and its youth organization. The İGD organized international solidarity activities for Chile, Iran, Palestine and others, and campaigned on issues including safety of life and freedom of education, and democratization of textbooks. It worked in cooperation with the Progressive High School Students Organization (İLD) and Apprentices Organization (Çırak–Der). The İGD also worked for unity of the broader progressive youth movement, especially developing cooperation with other youth organizations such as Genç Öncü ("Young Vanguard"), the Socialist Youth League, and the Kurdish Revolutionary Democratic Culture Organization (DDKD).

The organization was banned on 6 November 1979 by the martial law authorities, but continued its activities until the 12 September 1980 military coup d'etat. The İGD underwent a number of organizational changes during the military regime as the youth wing of the TKP, which was dissolved in a series of mergers after forming the United Communist Party of Turkey (TBKP) together with the Workers' Party of Turkey (TİP), joining a new legal Socialist Unity Party in the early 1990s.

See also
 All Progressive Youth Association

References

Youth wings of political parties in Turkey
Youth wings of communist parties
Youth organizations established in 1976